Sepideh-ye Gol Gol (also Romanized as Sepīdeh-ye Gol Gol and Sefīdeh-ye Gol Gol; also known as Gol Gol, Gulgul, and Gol Gol-e Garāvandī) is a village in Gol Gol Rural District, in the Central District of Kuhdasht County, Lorestan Province, Iran. At the 2006 census, its population was 1,048, in 201 families.

References 

Towns and villages in Kuhdasht County